Liberal National or Liberal National Party may mean:
 Liberal National Party of Queensland, a current Australian political party
 National Liberal Party (UK, 1931), a former British political party also known as the Liberal National Party

See also
 Liberal–National Coalition, a political coalition in Australia
 National Liberal Party (disambiguation)